László Z. Molnár (23 June 1883 – 1 November 1956) was a Hungarian stage and film actor. He was born in Zombor, Austria-Hungary (now Sombor, Serbia) and died in Budapest.

Selected filmography
 99 (1919 film)
 Oliver Twist (1919)
 Neither at Home or Abroad (1919)
 St. Peter's Umbrella (1935)
 I May See Her Once a Week (1937)
 80 Mile Speed (1937)
 I defended a woman (1938)

Bibliography
 Kulik, Karol. Alexander Korda: The Man Who Could Work Miracles''. Virgin Books, 1990.

External links

1883 births
1956 deaths
Hungarian male film actors
Hungarian male silent film actors
20th-century Hungarian male actors
Hungarian male stage actors
People from Sombor